The 2020 Eliteserien promotion/relegation play-offs was the 47th time a spot in the Eliteserien was decided by play-off matches between top tier and second-level clubs. In the play-offs, five teams competed for one spot in the 2021 Eliteserien.

Background 
The play-offs take place following the conclusion of the regular season and are contested by the 14th-placed club in Eliteserien and the four clubs finishing below the two automatic promotion places in the 1. divisjon. The fixtures are determined by final league position – the first round will be played between the 5th and 6th placed teams, and the winner will advance to play away to the 4th placed team in the second round. The winner of the second round will advance to play away to 3rd placed team in the third round. The winner of the third round will meet the 14th placed team in the Eliteserien on neutral ground.

Qualified teams 
Five teams entered a play-off for the last Eliteserien spot for the 2021 season. These were:

 Mjøndalen (14th placed team of the 2020 Eliteserien)
 Sogndal (3rd placed team in the 2020 1. divisjon)
 Ranheim (fourth placed team in the 2020 1. divisjon)
 Åsane (fifth placed team in the 2020 1. divisjon)
 Raufoss (sixth placed team in the 2020 1. divisjon)

Final league position 
Only the top 8 teams are displayed.

1. divisjon Promotion playoffs

Matches 
The third to sixth-placed teams took part in the promotion play-offs; these were single leg knockout matches, three rounds involving 1. divisjon teams and a final between the winner of these rounds and the 14th-placed team in Eliteserien.

The winners, Sogndal, advanced to play the 14th-placed team in Eliteserien, Mjøndalen, in the Eliteserien play-offs for a spot in the top-flight in the 2021 Eliteserien.

First round

Second round

Third round

Final 
The 14th-placed team in Eliteserien (Mjøndalen) played against the winners of the 1. divisjon promotion play-offs (Sogndal) on neutral ground to decide who will play in the 2021 Eliteserien.

Mjøndalen won 3–2 and maintained their position in the Eliteserien; Sogndal stayed in the 1. divisjon.

Bracket

References 

2020 in Norwegian football
Eliteserien play-offs